Salak is a species of palm tree.

Salak may also refer to:
 Mount Salak, a mountain in West Java, Indonesia
 Salak, North Sumatra, a place in Indonesia
 Salak, Iran, a village in South Khorasan Province, Iran
 Salak Airport, an airport near Maroua, Cameroon
 Salak, Cameroon a village in Cameroon